Hugh Bateman may refer to:

 Sir Hugh Bateman, 1st Baronet (1756–1824), of the Bateman baronets
 Hugh Bateman-Champain (1869–1933), British Army officer and cricketer

See also
Bateman (surname)